Copelatus luridescens is a species of diving beetle. It is part of the genus Copelatus in the subfamily Copelatinae of the family Dytiscidae. It was described by Régimbart in 1889.

References

luridescens
Beetles described in 1889